The 1931 World Table Tennis Championships men's doubles was the fifth edition of the men's doubles championship.
Miklós Szabados and Viktor Barna defeated Lajos Dávid and István Kelen in the final by three sets to one win a third consecutive title.

Results

See also
List of World Table Tennis Championships medalists

References

-